Overlooked No More is a recurring feature in the obituary section of The New York Times, which honors "remarkable people" whose deaths had been overlooked by editors of that section since its creation in 1851. The feature was introduced on March 8, 2018 for International Women's Day, where the Times published fifteen obituaries of such "overlooked" women, and has since become a weekly feature in the paper.

The project was created by Amisha Padnani, the digital editor of the obituaries desk, and Jessica Bennett, the paper's gender editor. In its introduction, it was admitted that the paper's obituaries had been "dominated by white men", and that the project was intended to help "address these inequities of our time". 

In May 2018, it was reported that the Times had partnered with Anonymous Content and Paramount Television to develop a drama anthology franchise based on the feature, with each season chronicling a notable woman.

List of honorees

International Women's Day (March 8, 2018) 

 Ida B. Wells, (1862–1931), "took on racism in the deep south with powerful reporting on lynchings"
 Qiu Jin, (1875–1907), "beheaded by imperial forces, was 'China's Joan of Arc'"
 Mary Ewing Outerbridge, (1852–1886), "helped bring tennis to the United States"
 Diane Arbus, (1923–1971), "a photographer, whose portraits have compelled or repelled generations of viewers"
 Marsha P. Johnson, (1945–2002), "a transgender pioneer and activist"
 Sylvia Plath, (1932–1963), "a postwar poet unafraid to confront her despair"
 Henrietta Lacks, (1920–1951), "whose cells lead to a medical revolution"
 Madhubala, (1933–1969), "a Bollywood legend whose tragic life mirrored Marilyn Monroe's"
 Emily Warren Roebling, (1843–1903), "the woman behind the man who built the Brooklyn Bridge"
 Nella Larsen, (1891–1964), "wrestled with race and sexuality in the Harlem renaissance" 
 Ada Lovelace, (1815–1852), "mathematician who wrote the first computer program"
 Margaret Abbott, (1878–1955), "an unwitting olympic trailblazer"
 Belkis Ayón, (1967–1999), "a Cuban printmaker inspired by a secret male society"
 Charlotte Brontë, (1816–1855), "Novelist known for Jane Eyre"
 Lillias Campbell Davidson, (1853–1934), "an early advocate for women's cycling"

Black History Month (February 2019) 
During February 2019, in honor of Black History Month, the paper published obituaries for "a prominent group of black men and women" who were not examined at the time of their deaths. Padnani wrote that readers' suggestions of whom to write about "have yielded some of the most-read obituaries". 

 Gladys Bentley, (1907–1960), "a gender bending blues performer who became 1920s Harlem royalty".
 Scott Joplin, (1867–1917), "a pianist and ragtime master who wrote 'The Entertainer' and the groundbreaking opera 'Treemonisha'.
 Margaret Garner, (1833–1858), "who killed her own daughter rather than return her to the horrors of slavery".
 Major Taylor, (1878–1932), "a world champion bicycle racer whose fame was undermined by prejudice".
Zelda Wynn Valdes, (1905–2001), "a fashion designer who outfitted the glittery stars of screen and stage".
 Alfred Hair, (1941–1970), "a charismatic businessman who created a movement for Florida’s black artists".
 Nina Mae McKinney, (1912–1957), "an actress who defied the barrier of race to find stardom in Europe".
 Granville T. Woods, (1856–1910), "an inventor known as the 'Black Edison'".
 Oscar Micheaux, (1884–1951), "a pioneering filmmaker prefiguring independent directors like Spike Lee and Tyler Perry".
 Mary Ellen Pleasant, (1814–1907), "born into slavery, she became a Gold Rush-era millionaire and a powerful abolitionist". 
 Elizabeth Jennings Graham, (1827–1901), "Life experiences primed her to fight for racial equality. Her moment came on a streetcar ride to church."
 Philip A. Payton Jr., (1876–1917), "a real estate magnate who turned Harlem into a black mecca". 
 Moses Fleetwood Walker, (1857–1924), "the first black baseball player in the big leagues, even before Jackie Robinson".

Other honorees 

Vera Menchik, first women’s world chess champion, published September 2, 2022
Regina Jonas, first woman to be ordained as a rabbi, published August 19, 2022
William Benjamin Gould (1837–1923), a enslaved memoirist, published June 17, 2022.
Brad Lomax, "a bridge between civil rights movements," published July 8, 2020
Earl Tucker, "a dancer known as 'Snakehips,'" published December 18, 2019
Bessie Coleman, "pioneering African-American aviatrix", published December 11, 2019 
Rose Mackenberg, "Houdini's secret 'ghost-buster,'" published December 6, 2019
Lillian Harris Dean, "culinary entrepreneur known as 'Pig Foot Mary,'" published November 27, 2019
Pauline Boty, "rebellious Pop artist", published November 20, 2019
Annie Londonderry, "who traveled the world by bicycle," published November 11, 2019
Olive Morris, "fought for black women's rights in Britain," published October 30, 2019
Sanmao, "'wandering writer' who found her voice in the desert," published October 23, 2019
Lotte Reiniger, "animator who created magic with scissors and paper," published October 16, 2019
Mitsuye Endo, "a name linked to justice for Japanese-Americans," published October 9, 2019
Robert Johnson, "bluesman whose life was a riddle," published September 25, 2019
Elizabeth A. Gloucester, "'richest' black woman and ally of John Brown," published September 18, 2019
Mihri Rassim, "feminist artist in the Ottoman Empire," published September 12, 2019
Alice Guy Blaché, "the world's first female filmmaker," published September 6, 2019
Elizabeth Rona, "pioneering scientist amid dangers of war," published August 28, 2019
Lau Sing Kee, "war hero jailed for helping immigrants," published August 21, 2019
Rani of Jhansi, "India's warrior queen who fought the British," published August 14, 2019
William Byron Rumford, "a civil rights champion in California," published August 7, 2019
Georgia Gilmore, "who fed and funded the Montgomery bus boycott," published July 31, 2019
Gertrude Benham, "who climbed the world one mountain at a time," published July 24, 2019
Florence Merriam Bailey, "who defined modern bird-watching," published July 17, 2019
Else Ury, "[her] stories survived World War II. She did not," published July 10, 2019
Ralph Lazo, "who voluntarily lived in an internment camp," published July 3, 2019
Bill Larson, "who became a symbol of gay loss in New Orleans," published June 26, 2019
Claude Cahun, "whose photographs explored gender and sexuality," published June 19, 2019
Ma Rainey, "the 'Mother of the Blues,'" published June 12, 2019
Alan Turing, "condemned code breaker and computer visionary," published June 5, 2019
Emma Stebbins, "who sculpted an angel of New York," published May 29, 2019
Debra Hill, "producer who parlayed 'Halloween' into a cult classic," published May 22, 2019
Grace Banker, "whose 'Hello Girls' decoded calls in World War I," published May 15, 2019
Barbara Rose Johns, "who defied segregation in schools," published May 8, 2019
Annie Edson Taylor, "who tumbled down Niagara Falls into fame," published May 1, 2019
Martin Sostre, "who reformed America's prisons from his cell," published April 24, 2019
Aloha Wanderwell, "explorer and filmmaker," published April 17, 2019
Rose Morgan, "a pioneer in hairdressing and Harlem," published April 10, 2019
S. N. Goenka, "who brought mindfulness to the West," published April 3, 2019
Bessie Blount, "wartime inventor and handwriting expert," published March 27, 2019
Elizabeth Peratrovich, "rights advocate for Alaska Natives," published March 20, 2019
Isabella Goodwin, "New York City's first female police detective," published March 13, 2019
Julia Morgan, "pioneering female architect," published March 6, 2019
Dondi, "the underground graffiti adventures of," published February 27, 2019
Dorothy Bolden, "who started a movement for domestic workers," published February 20, 2019
Dudley Randall, "whose broadside press gave a voice to black poets," published February 13, 2019
Mabel Grammer, "whose brown baby plan found homes for hundreds", published February 6, 2019
 Forough Farrokhzad, "Iranian poet, who broke barriers of sex and society", published January 30, 2019
 Mabel Stark, "fearless tiger trainer", published January 23, 2019
 Isabelle Kelley, "developed a food stamp program to feed millions", published January 16, 2019
 Laura De Force Gordon, "suffragist, journalist and lawyer", published January 9, 2019
 Karen Spärck Jones, "established the basis for search engines", published January 2, 2019
 Gertrude Beasley, "wrote an uncompromising memoir, then vanished", published December 19, 2018 
 Elizabeth Keckly, "dressmaker and confidante to Mary Todd Lincoln", published December 12, 2018
 Charley Parkhurst, "gold rush legend with a hidden identity", published December 5, 2018
 Noor Inayat Khan, "Indian princess and British spy", published November 28, 2018 
 Lilian Jeannette Rice, "architect who lifted a style in California", published November 21, 2018 
 Pandita Ramabai, "Indian scholar, feminist and educator", published November 14, 2018 
 Jackie Mitchell, "fanned two of the baseball's greats", published November 7, 2018 
 Miki Gorman, "the unlikely winner of the marathon", published October 31, 2018 
 Rose Zar, "a holocaust survivor who hid in plain sight", published October 24, 2018 
 Kin Yamei, "the Chinese doctor who introduced tofu to the West", published October 17, 2018 
 Annemarie Schwarzenbach, "author, photographer, and 'ravaged angel'", published October 10, 2018 
 Minnie Mae Freeman Penney, "Nebraska's fearless maid", published October 3, 2018 
 Voltairine de Cleyre, "America's 'greatest woman anarchist'", published September 26, 2018 
 Ana Mendieta, "a Cuban artist who pushed boundaries", published September 19, 2018 
 Marthe McKenna, "nurse who spied for the British in World War I", published September 12, 2018 
 Melitta Bentz, "invented the coffee filter", published September 5, 2018 
 Ruby Payne-Scott, "explored space with radio waves", published August 29, 2018 
 Doria Shafik, "led Egypt's women liberation movement", published August 22, 2018 
 Matilda Sissieretta Joyner Jones, "a soprano that shattered racial barriers", published August 15, 2018 
 Julia Sand, "whose letters inspired a president", published August 8, 2018 
 Clara Lemlich, "crusading leader of labor rights", published August 1, 2018 
 Edmonia Lewis, "sculptor or worldwide acclaim", published July 25, 2018 
 Beatrice Tinsley, "astronomer who saw the course of the universe", published July 18, 2018 
 Bette Nesmith Graham, "invented liquid paper", published July 11, 2018 
 Emma Gatewood, "first woman to conquer the Appalachian trail alone", published June 27, 2018 
 Amrita Sher-Gil, "a pioneer of Indian art", published June 21, 2018 
 Fannie Farmer, "modern cookery's pioneer", published June 14, 2018 
 Mary Ann Shadd, "shook up the abolitionist movement", published June 7, 2018 
 Sophia Perovskaya, "the Russian icon who was hanged for killing a czar", published May 31, 2018 
 Esther Hobart Morris, "she followed a trail to Wyoming. Then she blazed one.", published May 24, 2018 
 Margarita Xirgu, "theater radical who staged Lorca's plays", published May 17, 2018 
 Leticia Ramos-Shahani, "a Philippine women's rights pioneer", published May 10, 2018 
 Julia de Burgos, "a poet who helped shape Puerto Rico's identity", published May 3, 2018 
 Maria Bochkareva, "led women into battle in WWI", published April 26, 2018 
 Harriot Daley, "the Capitol's first telephone operator", published April 17, 2018 
 Lin Huiyin and Liang Sicheng, "chroniclers of Chinese architecture", published April 11, 2018 
 Bessie Stringfield, "the motorcycle queen of Miami", published April 4, 2018 
 Yu Gwan-Sun, "a Korean independence activist who defied Japanese rule", published March 29, 2018 
 Ruth Wakefield, "invented the chocolate chip cookie", published March 22, 2018 
 Alison Hargreaves, "conquered Everest solo and without bottled oxygen", published March 15, 2018

Series 

In April 2019, Netflix and Higher Ground Productions (the production company founded by Barack Obama and Michelle Obama) announced that they would be adapting Overlooked into a scripted anthology series. The series would be produced by Liza Chasin of 3dot Productions and Joy Gorman Wettels of Anonymous Content.

Musical 

In May 2019, The Waa-Mu Show at Northwestern University presented a new, student-written musical based on Amisha Padnani and the Overlooked series, entitled For the Record.

References 

The New York Times
2018 establishments in New York City
Publications established in 2018